Day is an Adamawa language of southern Chad, spoken by 50,000 or so people southeast of Sarh. Ethnologue reports that its dialects are mutually intelligible, but Blench (2004) lists Ndanga, Njira, Yani, Takawa as apparently separate languages.

Pierre Nougayrol's publications and field notes of Day from the 1970s constitute almost all of the available materials on the Day language.

Güldemann (2018) notes that Day has few morphological and lexical features that are typical of Niger-Congo, and hence cannot be classified with certainty.

Lexicon
Some fish names in Day:

Other animal names:

kòŋní ʔólò (Pila wernei), a gastropod

Plant names in Day:

References

Roger Blench, 2004. List of Adamawa languages (ms)

Languages of Chad
Mbum–Day languages